The ladies' individual skating event was held as part of the figure skating at the 1932 Winter Olympics. It was the fifth appearance of the event, which had previously been held twice at the Summer Olympics in 1908 and 1920 as well as at the Winter Games in 1924 and 1928. The competition was held on Tuesday 9 February and on Wednesday 10 February 1932. Fifteen figure skaters from seven nations competed.

Results
Sonja Henie successfully defended her 1928 title with Austrian Fritzi Burger finishing in second place again.

The points and score are given as shown in the official Olympic report, placing Colledge in eighth, Phillips in ninth, Davis in twelfth, and Fisher in 13th.

Referee:
  Joel B. Liberman

Judges:
  Yngvar Bryn
  Herbert J. Clarke
  Hans Grünauer
  Walter Jakobsson
  J. Cecil McDougall
  Georges Torchon
  Charles M. Rotch

References

External links
 Official Olympic Report
 sports-reference
 

Figure skating at the 1932 Winter Olympics
1932 in figure skating
Alp
OLy